Eva Ulrika Birgitta Räsänen ( Wahlström; born 30 October 1980) is a Finnish former professional boxer who competed from 2010 to 2020. She held the WBC female super-featherweight title from 2015 to 2020 and at regional level the European female super-featherweight title from 2012 to 2015. As an amateur she won a silver medal in the lightweight division at the 2004 and 2005 Women's European Championships, and represented Finland at the 2006 Women's World Championships. She is the most successful professional boxer from Finland to date, being the first and only Finn to have won a world title from one of the four major boxing sanctioning bodies.

Amateur career
Wahlström began boxing from around the age of 15–16, representing Loviisan Riento sports club. She went on to have a highly successful amateur career, winning ten consecutive gold medals at the Finnish national championships (1999–2008), gold four times at the Nordic Championships (2003–05, 2007) and silver twice at the European Championships (2004 and 2005).

Professional career
After her lengthy amateur career, Wahlström made her professional debut on 26 March 2010, scoring a third-round stoppage over Irina Boldea. On 21 May 2011, Wahlström fought Milena Koleva to a six-round split draw. Wahlström won her first major regional championship—the vacant European female super-featherweight title—on 31 March 2012, defeating Agota Ilko via a ten-round unanimous decision (UD).

During the summer of 2012, Wahlström was struck with a pulmonary embolism, which required career-threatening medication. Having spent most of 2013 recovering, she returned to the ring on 7 December to face decorated former kickboxing, K-1 and Muay Thai medallist Anna Sikora, whom she defeated with ease in a six-round UD. Wahlström made one defence of her European title on 16 August 2014, winning a ten-round UD over Djemilla Gontaruk.

On 25 April 2015, Wahlström defeated Natalia Vanesa del Valle Aguirre in a ten-round UD. In doing so, she won the vacant WBC female super-featherweight title and became the first Finnish boxer in history to win a major world title. Her first defence of the title was a successful one, as she won a ten-round UD over Dahiana Santana on 18 March 2016.

In September 2018, it was announced that Walhström would face Firuza Sharipova in defence of her WBC title, as well as Sharipova's IBO title. However, due to Sharipova's injury, the fight was pushed back until eventually canceled. Instead, Wahlström faced Irish Katie Taylor on 15 December 2018 at Madison Square Garden in the New York City. Taylor defended her WBA and IBF female lightweight titles against Wahlström, who had to change her weight class for the match and thus did not have her WBC super-featherweight title on the line. Taylor won all ten rounds.

In August 2019, Wahlström retained her WBC super-featherweight title in a close match with Ronica Jeffrey.

Wahlström lost her title to Terri Harper in February 2020.

In March 2020, Wahlström confirmed media reports that she had retired. Out of 27 professional fights, she had won 23, lost two and two were draws.

Personal life
Wahlström is a Finland-Swede. She has two older brothers.

Wahlström married Finnish professional boxer, Niklas Räsänen, in September 2016. They have a son (born 2021) and both have a child from their previous relationships. Eva's older son, Leon (born 2009), won a bronze medal at the national junior boxing championships. The family resides in Porvoo.

Outside of boxing, Wahlström made an appearance as a personal trainer to contestants in the Finnish reality television series Suurin pudottaja (in the spring 2006 and autumn 2007 seasons), a Finnish version of The Biggest Loser, with swimmer Jani Sievinen.

Professional boxing record

References

External links

1980 births
Living people
People from Loviisa
Finnish women boxers
Reality television participants
Swedish-speaking Finns
World Boxing Council champions
Super-featherweight boxers
Lightweight boxers
European Boxing Union champions
World super-featherweight boxing champions
Light-welterweight boxers
Sportspeople from Uusimaa